Guillermo Durán and Máximo González were the defending champions, but the pair were not able to participate this year.
Nikola Mektić and Antonio Šančić won the title, defeating Christian Garin and Juan Carlos Sáez in the final, 6–3, 6–4.

Seeds

Draw

Draw

External links
 Main Draw

Aspria Tennis Cup - Doubles